Sarina Maskey (born 27 May 1987, in Gurkha) is a Nepalese beauty pageant winner. She was crowned as Miss Nepal International 2011 and represented Nepal in Miss International 2011 on 24 October 2011 in Chengdu, China.

Biography

Sarina Maskey was a delegate to the 2011 51st Miss International Beauty Pageant, held in the Sichuan Opera Theater in Chengdu, China. She represented Nepal and was selected as one of the top contestants for the main sponsor round. She was among the six girls who received an opportunity to perform the traditional dance. She was also selected to perform at the charity event, and she auctioned an Ankhi-Jhyal at Miss International 2011 Event. She was selected as one of the beauties to perform in the charity.

She sported various cloth designs during The Craft Walk 2011, organized by Handicraft Design & Development Center.

Maskey modelled at Fashion Gala 2012, which was organized by At House of Fashion & Event Extravaganza.

References

1987 births
Living people
Miss Nepal winners
Miss International 2011 delegates
Nepalese beauty pageant winners
Nepalese female models

ne:सरिना मास्के